The Florida gar (Lepisosteus platyrhincus) is a species of gar found in the US from the Savannah River and Ochlockonee River watersheds of Georgia and throughout peninsular Florida. Florida gar can reach a length over 3 ft (91 cm). The young feed on zooplankton and insect larvae, as well as small fish. Adults mainly eat fish, shrimp, and crayfish. Although edible, they are not popular as food. The roe is highly toxic to many animals, including humans and birds.

Appearance
This is a mid-sized species of gar. This species has irregular round, black spots on the top of its head and over the entire body including the anal fin. The distance of the eyes is less than two-thirds the length of the snout. Also, it has a shorter, broad snout with a single row of irregularly spaced sharp teeth on the upper and lower jaws. No bony scales are on the throat. Their color is olive-brown on the back and upper sides, with a white to yellow belly. The young may have dark stripes on the back and sides.

Environment
They can be found in the Ochlockonee River and waters east and in peninsular Florida in medium to large lowland streams, canals, and lakes with muddy or sandy bottoms near underwater vegetation. They are often found in medium to shallow waters. They use an air bladder to breathe air which helps them survive in poorly oxygenated water.
They sometimes will hide in weeds in 4-10 feet. Usually when you find them here, they will have their head in the weeds and will only show a small portion of the body. Some times they will be hiding on the edge of weeds. Here they will be about 6-10 inches below the surface. Usually the bottom will be 10 feet or more.

Reproduction
This occurs in late winter and early spring, with spawning typically occurring between February and March. Groups of both sexes come together in shallow, weedy water where the females discharge their adhesive eggs among the aquatic plants. Female's eggs are typically fertilized by multiple males. The hatched young possess an adhesive organ on the end of their snouts and stay attached to vegetation until about 0.8 in (2 cm) long. Following  spawning in the late winter and early spring, male Florida gars undergo a decrease in their reproductive parameters throughout the summer. This includes a decrease in reproductive hormone levels and gonad maturation.

Behavior 
During the dry season, Florida gars burrow into the sediments of the marshes they inhabit and aestivate through the dry season. Aestivation, similar to hibernation in other species, lowers the animal's metabolic rate. This allows the Florida gar to withstand the high temperatures and dry conditions of their habitats during the summer.

Feeding habits 
Adult Florida gar are ambush predators; they stalk their prey and utilize a lateral lunge of their long heads in order to strike and catch their prey. These strikes are very short and fast, typically lasting for only 25 to 40 milliseconds in length. Upon catching their prey, the gar thrash their head from side to side to manipulate the prey before repositioning it to swallow it head first. Adult Florida gar tend to feed on fish, shrimp and crayfish, while young gar feed on zooplankton and insect larvae.

See also
List of fish species in Florida

References

 

Lepisosteidae
Gar, Florida
Fauna of the Southeastern United States
Freshwater fish of the Southeastern United States
Fish described in 1842
Freshwater fish of North America